is an early ninth century Buddhist text. It is best known as a valuable resource for Japanese historical linguistics as well as Buddhist history.

Manuscript
Tōdaiji Fujumonkō was composed sometime between 796 and 830. The compiler is unknown, but speculated to have been a priest belonging to the Dharma character school due to the large usage of related vocabulary. The original manuscript did not contain a title, but one was later added.

In 1939, the manuscript owner  published a two-volume collotype facsimile reproduction, one for the front and the other for the back. The original manuscript was designated as a National Treasure of Japan on July 4, 1938, but removed due to its destruction on April 14, 1945 in the fires resulting from the war. Only facsimiles remain.

Contents
The text is 396 lines in length. It is primarily a collection of prayers recorded at Buddhist memorial services.

Linguistics
Tōdaiji Fujumonkō is primarily important as a resource for early Early Middle Japanese. It is the oldest example of text written in kanji with katakana annotations. In addition, it exhibits many elements of Old Japanese grammar and vocabulary and maintains the phonetic distinction between /ko1/ and /ko2/. It also contains accounts in several dialects.

Notes

References
 
 
 

Late Old Japanese texts
Japanese language
Japanese Buddhist texts
Buddhism in the Heian period
Old National Treasures of Japan
9th-century Japanese literature